The 2015 CAF Champions League (officially the 2015 Orange CAF Champions League for sponsorship reasons) was the 51st edition of Africa's premier club football tournament organized by the Confederation of African Football (CAF), and the 19th edition under the current CAF Champions League format. The winner qualified for the 2015 FIFA Club World Cup, and earned the right to play in the 2016 CAF Super Cup.

TP Mazembe of the Democratic Republic of Congo won the competition for the fifth time in their history after a 4–1 aggregate victory over USM Alger of Algeria in the final. ES Sétif were the defending champions, but were eliminated in the group stage.

Association team allocation
All 56 CAF member associations may enter the CAF Champions League, with the 12 highest ranked associations according to their CAF 5-Year Ranking eligible to enter two teams in the competition. The title holders can also enter. As a result, theoretically a maximum of 69 teams could enter the tournament – although this level has never been reached.

For the 2015 CAF Champions League, the CAF uses the 2009–2013 CAF 5-Year Ranking, which calculates points for each entrant association based on their clubs’ performance over those 5 years in the CAF Champions League and CAF Confederation Cup. The criteria for points are the following:

The points are multiplied by a coefficient according to the year as follows:
2013 – 5
2012 – 4
2011 – 3
2010 – 2
2009 – 1

Teams
The following 57 teams from 44 associations entered the competition.

Teams in bold received a bye to the first round. The other teams entered the preliminary round.

Associations are shown according to their 2009–2013 CAF 5-Year Ranking – those with a ranking score have their rank and score indicated.

Notes

Schedule
The schedule of the competition was as follows (all draws are held at the CAF headquarters in Cairo, Egypt).

Qualifying rounds

The draw for the preliminary, first and second qualifying rounds was held on 22 December 2014.

Qualification ties were played on a home-and-away two-legged basis. If the aggregate score was tied after the second leg, the away goals rule would be applied, and if still level, the penalty shoot-out would be used to determine the winner (no extra time would be played).

Preliminary round

Notes

First round

Second round

The losers of the second round entered the 2015 CAF Confederation Cup play-off round.

Group stage

The draw for the group stage was held on 5 May 2015. The eight teams were drawn into two groups of four. Each group was played on a home-and-away round-robin basis. The winners and runners-up of each group advanced to the semi-finals.

Tiebreakers
The teams were ranked according to points (3 points for a win, 1 point for a draw, 0 points for a loss). If tied on points, tiebreakers would be applied in the following order:
Number of points obtained in games between the teams concerned;
Goal difference in games between the teams concerned;
Goals scored in games between the teams concerned;
Away goals scored in games between the teams concerned;
If, after applying criteria 1 to 4 to several teams, two teams still have an equal ranking, criteria 1 to 4 are reapplied exclusively to the matches between the two teams in question to determine their final rankings. If this procedure does not lead to a decision, criteria 6 to 9 apply;
Goal difference in all games;
Goals scored in all games;
Away goals scored in all games;
Drawing of lots.

Group A

Group B

Knockout stage

Knockout ties were played on a home-and-away two-legged basis. If the aggregate score was tied after the second leg, the away goals rule would be applied, and if still level, the penalty shoot-out would be used to determine the winner (no extra time would be played).

Bracket

Semi-finals
In the semi-finals, the group A winners played the group B runners-up, and the group B winners played the group A runners-up, with the group winners hosting the second leg.

Final

In the final, the order of legs was determined by a draw, held after the group stage draw.

Top scorers

See also
2015 CAF Confederation Cup
2015 FIFA Club World Cup
2016 CAF Super Cup

References

External links
Orange CAF Champions League 2015, CAFonline.com

 
2015
1